The Fugitive (French: Le fugitif) is a 1947 French drama film directed by Robert Bibal and starring René Dary, Jean Debucourt and Madeleine Robinson.

The film's sets were designed by the art director Jacques Krauss.

Synopsis
Wrongly convicted of a crime he did not commit, a man escapes from prison and goes in search of the real culprit. His hunt takes him to Canada where his former girlfriend is now living, married to a doctor.

Cast
 René Dary as Fred
 Jean Debucourt as Le docteur Jacques Bréville
 Madeleine Robinson as Simone
 Alfred Adam as Bank
 Albert Dinan as Mac Gregg
 Arlette Merry as Deanna
 Pierre Dudan as Un trappeur
 Philippe Hersent as Pole
 Georges Lannes as Lechartier

References

Bibliography 
 Rège, Philippe. Encyclopedia of French Film Directors, Volume 1. Scarecrow Press, 2009.

External links 
 

1947 drama films
French drama films
1940s French-language films
Films directed by Robert Bibal
French black-and-white films
Films set in Canada
1940s French films

fr:Le Fugitif (film, 1947)